Spring Valley is a village in Pierce and St. Croix counties in Wisconsin, United States. The population was 1,401 at the 2020 census. Of those, 1,390 were in Pierce County and 11 in St. Croix County. The village is mostly within the Town of Spring Lake in Pierce County. Small parts also lie in the Town of Gilman, also in Pierce County, and the Town of Cady in St. Croix County.

Geography
Spring Valley is located at  (44.847111, -92.240130), along the Eau Galle River.

Natural attractions
Crystal Cave is about a mile southwest of Spring Valley. This privately held natural attraction, formed millions of years ago by ground water eroding the sandstone and dolomite that underlies the area, has been open to tourists since 1942. A local 16-year-old discovered an opening to the cave in 1881. It was excavated, developed and promoted to the public by an Eau Claire, Wisconsin amateur geologist and advertising man. Opening day drew 4,000 visitors. The owners have retained the flavor of the 1950s and enjoy sharing the site's geologic history with visitors.

Promoted as the Midwest's largest earthen dam, Eau Galle Dam and Recreation, northwest of town, was built by the Army Corps of Engineers in 1965 to protect Spring Valley from the Eau Galle River's surging flood waters. A recreational area has grown up around the dam's reservoir, Lake George.

Demographics

2010 census
As of the census of 2010, there were 1,352 people, 547 households, and 372 families living in the village. The racial makeup of the village was 98.4% White, 0.4% African American, 0.1% Native American, 0.3% Asian, 0.4% from other races, and 0.4% from two or more races. Hispanic or Latino of any race were 1.3% of the population.

There were 547 households, of which 35.1% had children under the age of 18 living with them, 53.9% were married couples living together, 9.3% had a female householder with no husband present, 4.8% had a male householder with no wife present, and 32.0% were non-families. 26.9% of all households were made up of individuals, and 11.5% had someone living alone who was 65 years of age or older. The average household size was 2.40 and the average family size was 2.90.

The median age in the village was 38.2 years. 25.7% of residents were under the age of 18; 5.8% were between the ages of 18 and 24; 27.2% were from 25 to 44; 27.8% were from 45 to 64; and 13.5% were 65 years of age or older. The gender makeup of the village was 49.3% male and 50.7% female.

2000 census
As of the census of 2000, there were 1,189 people, 459 households, and 296 families living in the village. The racial makeup of the village was 98.82% White, 0.08% African American, 0.17% Native American, 0.08% Asian, and 0.84% from two or more races. Hispanic or Latino of any race were 0.59% of the population.

There were 459 households, out of which 35.5% had children under the age of 18 living with them, 51.2% were married couples living together, 9.6% had a female householder with no husband present, and 35.3% were non-families. 30.5% of all households were made up of individuals, and 16.8% had someone living alone who was 65 years of age or older. The average household size was 2.46 and the average family size was 3.08.

In the village, the population was spread out, with 26.9% under the age of 18, 8.2% from 18 to 24, 25.7% from 25 to 44, 20.7% from 45 to 64, and 18.5% who were 65 years of age or older. The median age was 38 years. For every 100 females, there were 93.6 males. For every 100 females age 18 and over, there were 84.9 males.

The median income for a household in the village was $38,482, and the median income for a family was $45,714. Males had a median income of $35,000 versus $22,292 for females. The per capita income for the village was $17,844. About 2.4% of families and 5.9% of the population were below the poverty line, including 3.9% of those under age 18 and 14.3% of those age 65 or over.

See also
 List of cities in Wisconsin

References

External links

 
 Spring Valley Chamber of Commerce website
 Sanborn fire insurance maps: 1900 1912

Villages in Wisconsin
Villages in Pierce County, Wisconsin
Villages in St. Croix County, Wisconsin